Sons Of Rock (1988) is Menudo's 26th album (and fifth in English).

It featured Ricky Martin, Raymond Acevedo, Sergio Blass, Rubén Gómez and new member Angelo García.  This is the first English album the band recorded of all new material, without any previous Spanish songs translated into English. Angelo replaced Ralphy Rodríguez, after just one year of tenure, Rodríguez's parents pulled him off the band citing cruel treatment by management. In late 1988/early 1989, Sons Of Rock was re-released with a new album cover. This time it featured a neon magenta color, as well as a new picture of the group and current line-up: Ricky Martin, Sergio Blass, Rubén Gómez, Angelo García and new member Robert Avellanet replacing Raymond Acevedo.

Track
 "Sons of Rock" - Sergio Blass (written by Marc Anthony)
 "Good Lovin'" - Ruben Gomez (written by A. Resnick, R. Clark)
 "TLC" - Ricky Martin (written by Lynsey de Paul, Terry Britten)
 "Miss You 'Til Tomorrow" - Raymond Acevedo (written by Papo Gely)
 "Say Why" - Ricky Martin (written by Papo Gely)
 "You Got Potential" - Angelo Garcia (written by A. R. Scott, M. Jay)
 "Nights on Fire" - Ruben Gomez (written by Peter S. Bliss)
 "999" - Raymond Acevedo (written by D. Danielson, P. Deremer)
 "To Leave Once More" - Angelo Garcia (written by M. Anthony, P. Gely)
 "I Will" - Sergio Blass (written by Papo Gely)

References

Menudo (band) albums
1988 albums